The Emmett McDonald House is a historic house in rural White County, Arkansas.  It is located southeast of McRae, east of the junction of South Grand Avenue and Gammill Road.  It is a -story vernacular wood-frame structure, with a tall gabled roof and novelty siding.  A gabled porch extends across the front, supported by box columns on brick piers.  It was built about 1935, and is one of the few surviving houses from that time period in the county.

The house was listed on the National Register of Historic Places in 1992.

See also
National Register of Historic Places listings in White County, Arkansas

References

Houses on the National Register of Historic Places in Arkansas
Houses completed in 1935
Houses in White County, Arkansas
National Register of Historic Places in White County, Arkansas
1935 establishments in Arkansas